Bhookamp is a 1993 Bollywood action film, produced by Markand Adhikari under the Sri Adhikari Brothers banner and directed by Gautam Adhikari. It stars Jeetendra, Rahul Roy, Mamta Kulkarni, Deepa Sahi in the pivotal roles and music composed by Jatin–Lalit. This was the debut movie for villain Mohan Joshi, prior to that, he had worked in Marathi movies. Bhookamp is a crime thriller, made on the International Drug cartel, Syndicate, operating in India, through Extortion, in local parlance, the "Supari" killers.

Plot
Prof. Ajay Saxena, (Jeetendra), is a common man with a strong streak of honesty, who arrives in the city of Mumbai, and joins as a Psychology professor in a college run by Mahendra Khanna, (Navin Nischol). One day, he criticizes a student, Jaggi aka Jagdish, for his unruly behavior,  not knowing that Jaggi was the nephew of Ramniklal and Mahesh Shah, who controlled the drug trade in the city, under the protection of a Don, Daya Patil (Mohan Joshi). Ajay stays as a paying guest with Mrs. D'Sa, whose son Johnny is an ideal student for him. Jaggi takes his revenge by turning Johnny into a drug addict and getting him killed by a drug overdose. Then, the entire locality is witness to the slit-throat gory murder of Mrs. D'Sa on the crime-infested Mumbai streets, by gangster Daya Patil. Ajay cannot do anything and loses his hope in the due process of law, though his ex-student Inspector Rahul Singh (Rahul Roy), keeps assuring him to the contrary.

Satyajeet Anand is an editor of a newspaper, "The New Daily Times", portrayed by Suresh Oberoi, who is always hell-bent on exposing the criminals, dissuaded by his wife Pooja (Deepa Sahi), who fears their wrath. He helps Ajay in knowing who are the people who are corrupting the society, but is brutally murdered by them. His sister Kavita (Mamta Kulkarni), thereafter, is publicly disrobed in the college library by drug peddler Jaggi. Ajay does not keep quiet now, and refuses to be a mere spectator to the heinous crime that the Illegal drug trade is. He wreaks havoc in bloody revenge by eliminating all the anti-social elements from the society. However, in the end, he is punished by the courts with life imprisonment, for taking the law into his own hands.

Cast 
 Jeetendra as Professor Ajay Saxena
 Rahul Roy as Inspector Rahul Singh
 Mamta Kulkarni as Kavita Anand
 Deepa Sahi as Mrs. Pooja Satyajeet Anand
 Rohini Hattangadi as Mrs. D'Sa
 Mohan Joshi as Gangster Daya Patil
 Navin Nischol as Mahendra Khanna
 Suresh Oberoi as Editor Satyajeet Anand 
 Achyut Potdar as Professor Gupta
 Ajit Vachani as Maniklal Shah
 Mahavir Shah as Mahesh Shah
 Johny Lever as Murli
 Anant Mahadevan as Akhtar
 Deven Bhojani 
 Siddharth Randeria

Soundtrack

References

External links 

Institute for Defence Studies and Analyses

1990s Hindi-language films
1993 films
Films scored by Jatin–Lalit
Indian crime thriller films
Indian crime action films
Indian action thriller films
1993 crime thriller films
1990s crime action films
1993 action thriller films